Henares is a station on Line 7 of the Madrid Metro. It is located in fare zone B1.

References 

Line 7 (Madrid Metro) stations
Railway stations in Spain opened in 2007
San Fernando de Henares